David Burke may refer to:

Entertainment
 David Burke (British actor) (born 1934), British television actor
 David Burke (American actor) (born 1967), American television actor
 David Burke (author), language books author
 David J. Burke (born 1948), producer, screenwriter and film and television director
 David Burke, author of a book on Melita Norwood
 David "Bombhead" Burke, a character played by Lee Otway on Hollyoaks

Sports
David Burke (Australian footballer) (born 1959), Australian rules footballer
David Burke (English footballer) (born 1960), English footballer
David Burke (boxer) (born 1975), English boxer
David Burke (Galway hurler) (born 1990), Irish hurler for Galway 
David Burke (Kilkenny hurler) (born 1981), Irish hurler for Kilkenny and Wexford
David Burke (athlete) in 1986 IAAF World Cross Country Championships – Junior men's race
David Burke (soccer), played for Albany BWP Highlanders
Davy Burke, Irish Gaelic football manager and former player

Others
 David Burke (politician) (born 1967), member of the Ohio House of Representatives
 David Burke (botanist) (1854–1897), English botanist 
 David Burke (chef) (born 1962), chef and restaurateur
 David W. Burke (1935–2014), American television news executive
 David A. Burke (1952–1987), American hijacker and former employee who caused the crash of Pacific Southwest Airlines Flight 1771
 David Burke (neurophysiologist) (born circa 1944), Australian expert in spinal and brain trauma